Maria Mies (born 1931, Steffeln, Rhine Province, Prussia, Germany) is a German professor of sociology and author of several feminist books, including Indian Women and Patriarchy (1980), Patriarchy and Accumulation on a World Scale (1986), and (with Bennholdt-Thomsen and von Werlhof) Women: The Last Colony (1988).

She is Professor of Sociology at the Cologne University of Applied Sciences, which is a Fachhochschule in Cologne, Germany. She worked for many years in India. In 1979 she established the Women and Development programme at the Institute of Social Studies in The Hague, Netherlands. She has been active in the women's movement and in women's studies since the late 1960s. She has published several books and many articles on feminist, ecological and developing-world issues. One of her main concerns is the development of an alternative approach in methodology and in economics. Having retired from teaching in 1993, she continues to be active in the women's and other social movements; she is a member of feministAttac, a women's network of Attac. She has published a book on the Multilateral Agreement on Investment and, with Veronika Bannholdt, has written a book on the subsistence perspective (from Patriarchy and Accumulation on a World Scale). She is married to the eco-socialist Saral Sarkar.

Bibliography 

Indian Women and Patriarchy: Conflicts and Dilemmas of Students and Working Women. New Delhi: Concept (1980). .
 Lace Makers of Narsapur: Indian Housewives Produce for the World Market. London: Zed Books (1982). .
 with Veronika Bennholdt-Thomsen, and Claudia Von Werlhof. 1988. Women: The Last Colony. London ; Atlantic Highlands, N.J., USA.
 with Vandana Shiva. Ecofeminism. London: Zed Books (1993). .
 with Sinith Sittirak. The Daughters of Development: Women in a Changing Environment. London: Zed Books (1998). .
 Patriarchy and Accumulation On A World Scale: Women in the International Division of Labour. London: Zed Books (1999). .
 with Veronika Bennholdt-Thomsen. The Subsistence Perspective: Beyond the Globalised Economy. London: Zed Books (2000). .
The Village and the World: My Life, Our Times. North Melbourne: Spinifex Press (2011). .

See also 
 Anarcha-feminism
 Ecofeminism
 Food self-provisioning

References 

1931 births
Living people
Feminist studies scholars
German sociologists
Anti-globalization writers
Autonomism
Ecofeminists
Writers from Rhineland-Palatinate
20th-century German non-fiction writers
German political writers
20th-century German women writers
German feminists
Women political writers